Mari Holm Lønseth  (born 29 August 1991) is a Norwegian politician. 
She was elected representative to the Storting from the constituency of Sør-Trøndelag for the period 2017–2021 for the Conservative Party.

She was re-elected to the Storting for the period 2021–2025.

References

1991 births
Living people
Conservative Party (Norway) politicians
Members of the Storting
Sør-Trøndelag politicians